Carol B. Tomé (born Carol Louise Buchenroth; January 8, 1957) is an American business executive who is currently the Chief Executive Officer of United Parcel Service (UPS). She is formerly of  The Home Depot, where she worked from 1995 to 2019, serving as Vice President and Treasurer and later as Executive Vice President and Chief Financial Officer.  She has served as a board member for UPS since 2003.

Biography

Carol B. Tomé was born Carol Louise Buchenroth on January 8, 1957 in Jackson, Wyoming. Tomé's family emphasized the value of hard work and capability in her upbringing, which Tomé characterizes as "an unbelievable childhood". She learned to hunt, fish, cook, sew, and live off the land. Her father was a community banker. Tomé took an early interest in finance, and envisioned herself following a similar path and working in banking after her graduation from business school at The University of Denver.

Tomé worked as a commercial lender at United Bank of Denver (now, Wells Fargo), was director of banking at Johns-Manville Corporation, and was vice president and treasurer of Riverwood International Corporation of Atlanta (now part of Graphic Packaging), a global paperboard, packaging, and packaging machinery firm. She joined The Home Depot in 1995 when they sought an experienced executive for an expansion into Mexico. She was promoted to CFO in 2001. During her time at the company, The Home Depot grew from 400 stores to 2,200 with revenue of nearly $100 billion. Its share price over her tenure increased more than 450%. She has received praise for The Home Depot's performance after its emergence from the 2008-09 financial and housing crisis.  After a brief retirement, she was announced Chief Executive Officer Elect of UPS, where she had been a member of the board of directors since 2003. In 2020 she became Chief Executive Officer of UPS.

Tomé has been a member of the board of the Federal Reserve Bank of Atlanta and served as chairman of that board, a member of The Committee of 200, the Atlanta Botanical Garden board of directors, The Business Council, the Metro Atlanta Chamber of Commerce as chairman of the board, the Grady Memorial Hospital as a board trustee, the International Business Council of the World Economic Forum, and the Verizon Communications board of directors.

Recognition
Tomé has been named twice to the Forbes list of The World's 100 Most Powerful Women as #16 and #12. In 2012, Tomé was listed second on The Wall Street Journals list of best chief financial officers, and among the top 50 most powerful women in business by Fortune magazine.

Tomé was selected for the inaugural 2021 Forbes 50 Over 50; made up of entrepreneurs, leaders, scientists and creators who are over the age of 50.

References

Living people
American women chief executives
United Parcel Service
University of Denver alumni
American chief financial officers
21st-century American women
1957 births